

This is a list of the National Register of Historic Places listings in Mobile County, Alabama.

This is intended to be a complete list of the properties and districts on the National Register of Historic Places in Mobile County, Alabama, United States. Latitude and longitude coordinates are provided for many National Register properties and districts; these locations may be seen together in an online map.

There are 138 properties and districts listed on the National Register in Mobile County, including 4 National Historic Landmarks. 114 of these sites, including all of the National Historic Landmarks, are located in Mobile, and are listed separately; the remaining 24 sites are listed here.

Current listings

Mobile

Outside Mobile

|}

See also

 List of National Historic Landmarks in Alabama
 National Register of Historic Places listings in Alabama

References

 
Mobile